The London Sketchbook, K.15 a–ss (Anh. 109b) is a series of 43 untitled pieces and sketches written by Wolfgang Amadeus Mozart between 1764 and 1765 while in London (see the Mozart family's grand tour). The set of works is denoted by its K number, followed by its respective letter, i.e. 15a, 15b, 15c, etc. 

Most pieces are extremely short, normally lasting from 40 seconds to a minute; however, some span as long as four minutes in total (see K. 15t). According to the Neue Mozart-Ausgabe, the intended purpose of this book was not for musical exercise, as once thought, rather for the young Mozart, who had just learned how to use pen and ink, to write down his own inspiration without needing anyone's help. Corrections by his father Leopold appear in pencil only.

K.15a–ss

15a – Allegretto in F for Piano
15b – Andantino in C for Piano
15c – Minuet in G for Piano
15d – Rondino in D for Piano
15e – Contredanse in G for Piano
15f – Minuet in C for Piano
15g – Fantasia (Prelude) in G for Organ or Piano
15h – Contredanse in F for Piano
15i – Minuet in A for Piano
15k – Minore in A minor for Piano
15l – Contredanse in A for Piano
15m – Minuet in F for Piano
15n – Andante in C for Piano
15o – Andante in D for Piano
15p – Movement to a Piano Sonata in G minor
15q – Andante in B-flat for Piano
15r – Andante in G minor for Piano
15s – Rondo in C for Piano
15t – Movement to a Piano Sonata in F
15u – Sicilianos in D minor for Piano
15v – Movement to a Piano Sonata in F
15w – Allemande in B-flat for Piano
15x – Movement to a Piano Sonata in F
15y – Minuet in G for Piano
15z – Gigue in C minor for Piano
15aa – Movement to a Piano Sonata in B-flat
15bb – Movement to a Piano Sonata in D
15cc – Minuet in E-flat for Piano
15dd – Andante in A-flat for Piano
15ee – Minuet in E-flat for Piano
15ff – Minuet in A-flat for Piano
15gg – Contredanse in B-flat for Piano
15hh – Rondo in F for Piano
15ii – Andante in B-flat for Piano
15kk – Movement to a Piano Sonata in E-flat
15ll – Presto in B-flat for Piano
15mm – Andante in E-flat for Piano
15nn – Movement to a Piano Sonata in F (fragment)
15oo – German Dance in F for Piano
15pp – Minuet in B-flat for Piano
15qq – Minuet in E-flat for Piano
15rr – Minuet in C for Piano (fragment)
15ss – Fugue in C for Piano (fragment)

Notable recordings

Several recordings have been made of the Sketchbook in recent years. Most are recorded on their intended instrument, the piano. However, in 1991 with the release of the Complete Mozart Edition, Vol. 45, Erik Smith orchestrated nearly all of the pieces here for winds and orchestra. With his orchestration he also grouped several pieces together to create a full, multiple-movement work. For example, he arranged K. 15b, a, and f as a single divertimento in C. Hans-Udo Kreuels also did a recording of the Sketchbook in 2003, as well as completing two of the fragmented works, K.15rr, and 15ss.

References

Sources
  Wolfgang Plath. Neue Mozart-Ausgabe, Series IX (Keyboard Music), Workgroup 27 (Keyboard Pieces), Volume 1: Notebooks. Bärenreiter, 1982.

External links

Early keyboard works by Wolfgang Amadeus Mozart
Compositions for solo piano
1764 compositions